The Mozambique women's national handball team is the national team of Mozambique. It is governed by the Federaçao Moçambicana de Andebol and takes part in international handball competitions.

African Championship record
1996 – 6th
1998 – 5th

External links
IHF profile

Women's national handball teams
Handball
National team